The H-II (H2) rocket was a Japanese satellite launch system, which flew seven times between 1994 and 1999, with five successes. It was developed by NASDA in order to give Japan a capability to launch larger satellites in the 1990s. It was the first two-stage liquid-fuelled rocket Japan made using only technologies developed domestically. It was superseded by the H-IIA rocket following reliability and cost issues.

Background  
Prior to H-II, NASDA had to use components licensed by the United States in its rockets. In particular, crucial technologies of H-I and its predecessors were from the Delta rockets (the manufacturer of the Delta rockets, McDonnell Douglas, later Boeing and the United Launch Alliance, would later use the H-II's technologies to create the Delta III, albeit short lived). Although the H-I did have some domestically produced components, such as LE-5 engine on the second stage and inertial guidance system, the most crucial part, the first stage engine, was a licence-built version of the Thor-ELT of the US. By developing the LE-7 liquid-fuel engine and the solid booster rockets for the first stage, all stages of H-II had become "domestically developed".

The H-II was developed under the following policies, according to a NASDA press release:
Develop the launch vehicle with Japanese space technology.
Reduce both development period and costs by utilizing developed technologies as much as possible.
Develop a vehicle which can be launched from the existing Tanegashima Space Center.
Use design criteria which allows sufficient performance for both the main systems and subsystems. Ensure that development will be carried out properly, and safety is taken into account.

The H-II was new, incorporating larger LH2/LOX tanks, and a new upper stage, consisting of a cylindrical LH2 tank with a capsule-shaped LOX tank. The LH2 tank cylinder carried payload launch loads, while the LOX tank and engine were suspended below within the rocket's inter-stage. The second stage was powered by a single LE-5A engine.

History 
Development of the LE-7 engine which started in 1984 was not without hardships, and a worker died in an accidental explosion. The first engine was completed in 1994, two years behind the original schedule. The Rocket Systems Corporation (RSC), a consortium of 74 companies including Mitsubishi Heavy Industries, Nissan Motors, and NEC, was established in 1990 to manage launch operations after the rockets' completion. In 1992, it had 33 employees.

In 1994, NASDA succeeded in launching the first H-II rocket, and succeeded in five launches by 1997. However, each launch cost 19 billion yen (US$190 million), too expensive compared to international competitors like Ariane. (This is in part due to the Plaza Accord's changes to the exchange rate, which was 240 yen to a dollar when the project planning started in 1982, but had changed to 100 yen a dollar by 1994.) Development of the next-generation H-IIA rockets started in order to minimize launch costs.

In 1996, RSC signed a contract with the Hughes Space and Communications Group to launch 10 satellites. The successive failure of flight 5 in 1998 and flight 8 in the following year brought an end to the H-II series and the contract with Hughes. To investigate the cause of the failure and to direct resources into the H-IIA, NASDA cancelled flight 7 (which was to be launched after F8 due to changes in schedule), and terminated the H-II series.

Launch history

Gallery

See also 
 H-II Orbiting Plane (HOPE)
 H-II Transfer Vehicle (HTV)
 H-II (rocket family)
 H-IIA
 H-IIB
 Comparison of orbital launchers families
 Comparison of orbital launch systems

References

External links
H-II Launch Vehicle , JAXA.

Mitsubishi Heavy Industries space launch vehicles
Vehicles introduced in 1994
Expendable space launch systems